Zinc finger protein 76 is a protein that in humans is encoded by the ZNF76 gene.

References

Further reading